Ettore Sottsass (Innsbruck, Austria 14 September 1917 – Milan, Italy 31 December 2007) was a 20th century Italian architect, noted for also designing furniture, jewellery, glass, lighting, home and office wares, as well as numerous buildings and interiors — often defined by bold colours.

Early life 
Sottsass was born in Innsbruck, Austria, and grew up in Turin, where his father, also named Ettore Sottsass, was an architect. The elder Sottsass belonged to the modernist architecture group Movimento Italiano per l'Architectura Razionale (MIAR), which was led by Giuseppe Pagano.

The younger Sottsass was educated at the Politecnico di Torino in Turin and graduated in 1939 with a degree in architecture. 

After the invasion of Italy by the Anglo-Americans, Sottsass enlisted in the Monterosa Division, a division of the Repubblica Sociale Italiana led by Benito Mussolini and his Republican Fascist Party, to fight in the mountains alongside Hitler's army (Sottsass tells his adventures as a Lieutenant of the Monterosa Division in his autobiography “Scritto di Notte" published by Adelphi).

After his time in the military, Sottsass opened his own architecture and design firm in Milan, Italy. Here he started designing furniture and experimented with different color, patterns and shapes. His work was often associated with pop culture with his brightly colored whimsical objects. His pieces were often made out of glass and ceramic.

Early career 
After returning home, Ettore Sottsass worked as an architect with his father, often on new modernist versions of buildings that were destroyed during the war. In 1947, living in Milan, he set up his own architectural and industrial design studio, where he began to create work in a variety of different media: ceramic, painting, sculpture, furniture, photography, jewelry, architecture and interior design.

In 1949 Sottsass married Fernanda Pivano, a writer, journalist, translator and critic. From 1954 to 1957 he was a member of the International Movement for an Imaginist Bauhaus, resigning due to the movement's perceived aggression and its lack of professionalism. In 1956, Sottsass traveled to New York City and began working in the office of George Nelson. He and Pivano traveled widely while working for Nelson, and returned to Italy after a few months.

Also in 1956, Sottsass was commissioned by the American entrepreneur Irving Richards on an exhibition of his ceramics.

Back in Italy in 1957, Sottsass joined Poltronova, a semi-industrial producer of contemporary furniture, as an artistic consultant. Much of the furniture he worked on there influenced the design he would create later with Memphis Milano.

In 1956, Sottsass was hired by Adriano Olivetti as a design consultant for Olivetti, to design electronic devices and develop the first Italian mainframe computer, the Elea 9003 for which he was awarded the Compasso d'Oro in 1959. He also designed office equipment, typewriters, and furniture. There Sottsass made his name as a designer who, through colour, form and styling, managed to bring office equipment into the realm of popular culture. His first typewriters, the Tekne 3 and the Praxis 48, were characterized by their sobriety and their angularity. With Perry A. King, Sottsass created the Valentine in 1969 which is considered today as a milestone in 20th century design and became a fashion accessory.

While continuing to design for Olivetti in the 1960s, Sottsass developed a range of objects which were expressions of his personal experiences traveling in the United States and India. These objects included large altar-like ceramic sculptures and his "Superboxes", radical sculptural gestures presented within a context of consumer product, as conceptual statements. Covered in bold and colorful, simulated custom laminates, they were precursors to Memphis, a movement which came more than a decade later. Around this time, Sottsass said: "I didn’t want to do any more consumerist products, because it was clear that the consumerist attitude was quite dangerous."  As a result, his work from the late 1960s to the 1970s was defined by experimental collaborations with younger designers such as Superstudio and Archizoom Associati, and association with the Radical movement, culminating in the foundation of Memphis at the turn of the decade.

In the early 1970s he designed the modular office equipment collection Synthesis 45.

Sottsass and Fernanda Pivano divorced in 1970, and in 1976 Sottsass married Barbara Radice, an art critic and journalist.

When Roberto Olivetti succeeded as head of the company, he named Sottsass artistic director and gave him a high salary, but Sottsass refused. Instead he created the Studio Olivetti independent of Olivetti and became instantly the most creative international centre of design associating research with creation and industrial strategy. His concern that his creativity would have been stifled by corporate work is documented in his 1973 essay "When I was a Very Small Boy".

In 1968, the Royal College of Art in London granted Sottsass an honorary doctorate.

Memphis Group 

With the rise of new groups (Global tools, Archizoom, Superstudio, UFO, Zzigurat, 9999...) the handmade appeared suddenly as the new game for experimentation, a lot of these new groups playing in this new/old path to renew creation. In October 1980, Sottsass was confronted with two proposals, one from Renzo Brugola, a dear old friend and carpenter, telling him his will "to make something together like in the good old times,” and the other one from Mario and Brunella Godani, owners of the Design Gallery Milano, who asked him to create "new furniture" for their gallery.

Ettore Sottsass founded the Memphis Group in Milan on 11 December 1980, after the Bob Dylan song "Stuck Inside of Mobile with the Memphis Blues Again" played during the group's inaugural meeting. The group was active from 1981 to 1988. The Memphis group was created in a reaction against the status quo. Sottsass centered the group's thinking around “radical, funny, and outrageous”—essentially, disregarding what was considered in “good taste” at that time. Art deco, the color palette of Pop Art and Kitsch theme from the 1950's inspired their work. Colorful laminate and terrazzo were commonly found in their work and incorporated in floors, tables and lamps. 

Sottsass also designed his own print. This was a squiggles print also known as Bacterio print. For the print, Sottsass used inspiration from the surface texture and form of a Buddhist temple in Madurai, India, he then abstracted this detail into the squiggles he named Bacterio. This pattern was then used on their furniture designs in as veneers and textiles.

The Memphis Group was a postmodern, collaborative, architecture and design group founded by Sottsass in Milan Italy. The group focused heavily on furniture design with an emphasis on unconventional types. The designers became well known for their bright and bold pieces with clashing colors. At the time, furniture was solely meant to be functional. However, the Memphis Group sought to prove otherwise with their highly decorative pieces. They poked fun at everyday pieces and turned them into works of art. Many criticized and said it was just a trend that wouldn’t last. Their unconventional ideas were controversial but have now become widely recognized and appreciated. The work continues to be influential throughout the world and can be seen in the Art Institute of Chicago, the Design Museum in London, The Museum of Modern Art in New York and many others.

Sottsass Associati

As the Memphis movement in the 1980s attracted attention worldwide for its energy and flamboyance, Ettore Sottsass began assembling a major design consultancy, which he named Sottsass Associati. Sottsass Associati was established in 1980 and gave the possibility to build architecture on a substantial scale as well as to design for large international industries. Besides Ettore Sottsass, the others founding members were Aldo Cibic, Marco Marabelli, Matteo Thun and Marco Zanini. Later, also Johanna Grawunder, Marco Susani, James Irvine, and Mike Ryan will join the firm. In 1985, Sottsass left Memphis to focus on the Associati.

Sottsass Associati, primarily an architectural practice, also designed elaborate stores and showrooms for Esprit, identities for Alessi, exhibitions, interiors, consumer electronics in Japan and furniture of all kinds. The studio was based on the cultural guidance of Ettore Sottsass and the work conducted by its many young associates, who quite often left to open their own studios. Sottsass Associati is now based in London and Milan and continue to sustain the work, philosophy and culture of the studio.

The studio works with former members of Memphis as well as with the architect Johanna Grawunder. It works for major companies like Apple, Philips, Siemens, Zanotta, Fiat, Alessi, and also realises the interior design of all the retail shops of Esprit (Esprit Holdings).

Notable achievements in design 

 Valentine typewriter, Olivetti, 1969
 Superbox cabinet, Poltronova, 1966
 Ultrafragola mirror, Poltronova, 1970
 Tahiti lamp, Memphis, 1981
 Murmansk fruit bowl, Memphis, 1982
 Carlton bookcase, Memphis, 1981
 Malabar bookcase, Memphis, 1981
 Casablanca cabinet, Memphis, 1981
 Enorme phone, 1986
 Miss don't you like caviar chair, 1987
 Apollodoro Gallery, clock on display, seventh event The Hour of Architects, with Michael Graves, Hans Hollei, Arata Isozaki, Paolo Portoghesi, paintings by Paolo Salvati, Rome, 1987
 Memories of China collection, the Gallery Mourmans, 1996
 Mandarin chair, Knoll, 1986
 Glass works for Venini
 Glass works for the CIRVA
 Nuovo Milano - cutlery set designed with assistance of Alberto Gozzi in 1987 for Alessi. Won XVIth Compasso d'oro award in 1991.
 Twergi collection, Alessi, 1989 and it sold for 60.000.000

Notable achievements in architecture 
 Fiorucci store, 1980
 Esprit showroom, Düsseldorf, 1985
 Esprit showroom, Zurich, 1985
 Esprit showroom, Hamburg, 1985
 Building, Marina di Massa, 1985
 Alessi showroom, Milan, 1985
 Wolf house, Ridgway (Colorado), 1985 with Johanna Grawunder
 Zibibbo bar, Fukuoka, 1989 
 Olabuenaga house, Maui, 1989 with Johanna Grawunder
 Cei house, Empoli, 1989
 Bischofberger house, Zurich, 1989 with Johanna Grawunder 
 Museum of Contemporary Art, Ravenne, 1992
 Ghella house, Roma, 1993
 Green house, London, 1993
 Motoryacht Amazon Express, 1994
 Golf and club resort, Zhaoqing, 1994
 Malpensa Airport, Milan, 1994
 Nanon house, Lanaken, 1995
 Van Impe house, Sint-Lievens-Houtem, 1996 with Johanna Grawunder
 Alitalia waiting room, 1997
 Bird House, Lanaken, 1998 with Johanna Grawunder
 Roppongi Island, Tokyo, 2004
 Sport house, Nanjing, 2004
 Entry Gates of the W. Keith and Janet Kellogg Gallery at the campus of Cal Poly Pomona, 1995

Other works

As an industrial designer, his clients included Fiorucci, Esprit, the Italian furniture company Poltronova, Knoll International, Serafino Zani, Alessi, Brondi, and Brionvega. As an architect, he designed the Mayer-Schwarz Gallery on Rodeo Drive in Beverly Hills, California, with its dramatic doorway made of irregular folds and jagged angles, and the home of David M. Kelley, designer of Apple's first computer mouse, in Woodside, California. The interiors of the Malpensa Airport, in Milan, were designed by Sottsass in the late 1990s, but he did not architect the building. In the mid-1990s, he designed the sculpture garden and entry gates of the W. Keith and Janet Kellogg Gallery at the campus of Cal Poly Pomona. He collaborated with well-known figures in the architecture and design field, including Aldo Cibic, James Irvine, Matteo Thun.

Sottsass created a vast body of work: furniture, jewelry, ceramics, glass, silver work, lighting, office machine design and buildings. He inspired generations of architects and designers. In 2006 the Los Angeles County Museum of Art held the first major museum survey exhibition of his work in the United States. A retrospective exhibition, Ettore Sottsass: Work in Progress, was held at the Design Museum in London in 2007. In 2009, the Marres Centre for Contemporary Culture in Maastricht presented a re-construction of a Sottsass' exhibition  'Miljö för en ny planet' (Landscape for a new planet), which took place in the Nationalmuseum in Stockholm in 1969. In 2017, on the occasion of Sottsass' 100th birthday, the Met Breuer museum in New York City presented the retrospective Ettore Sottsass: Design Radical.

One of his works—Telefono Enorme, designed with David M. Kelley for Brondi—is part of the MOMA Collection, as well as many drawings. Design objects and drawings by Sottsass are also in the permanent collections of the Metropolitan Museum of Art, the Design Museum in London, the Vitra Design Museum, the Brooklyn Museum, the Cooper Hewitt, Smithsonian Design Museum, the Stedelijk Museum, Los Angeles County Museum of Art, Musée National d'Art Moderne in Paris, Philadelphia Museum of Art, and the Museum of Fine Arts, Houston.

In 1999, he was awarded the Sir Misha Black award and was added to the College of Medallists.

In 2023, his work was included in the exhibition Mirror Mirror: Reflections on Design at Chatsworth at Chatsworth House.

Publications
 Guia Sambonet, Ettore Sottsass: Movili e Qualche Arredamento (Furniture and A Few Interiors), Arnoldo Mondadori Editore, 1985
 Hans Höger, Ettore Sottsass Jun.: Designer, Artist, Architect, Wasmuth, Tübingen/Berlin, 1993
 Barbara Radice, Ettore Sottsass: A Critical Biography, Thames & Hudson, 1993
 Francois Barre, Andrea Branzi, etc., Ettore Sottsass, Centre G. Pompidou, Paris, 1994
 Fulvio Ferrari, Ettore Sottsass: tutta la ceramica, Allemandi, Turin, 1996
 Bruno Bischofberger, Ettore Sottsass: Ceramics, Chronicle Books, 1996
 M. Carboni (edited by), Ettore Sottsass e Associati, Rizzoli, Milan, 1999
 M. Carboni (edited by), Ettore Sottsass: Esercizi di Viaggio, Aragno, Turin, 2001
 M. Carboni e B. Radice (edited by), Ettore Sottsass: Scritti, Neri Pozza Editore, Milan, 2002
 M. Carboni e B. Radice (edited by), Metafore, Skirà Editore, Milan, 2002
 M. Carboni (edited by), Sottsass: fotografie, Electa, Naples, 2004
 M. Carboni (edited by), Sottsass 700 disegni, Skirà Editore, Milan, 2005
 M. Carboni (edited by), Sottsass '60/'70, Editions HYX, Orléans, France, 2006
 Ronald T. Labaco and Dennis P. Doordan, Ettore Sottsass: Architect and Designer, Los Angeles County Museum of Art/Merrell, London/New York, 2006
 Sally Schöne, Ettore Sottsass: auch der Turm von Babel war aus gabrannter Erde (and tower of Babel was also made of terracotta), Wienand, 2011
 Philippe Thomé, Ettore Sottsass, Phaidon, New York, 2014
 Barbara Radice, Ettore Sottsass: There is a Planet, catalogue for exhibition at Triennale Design Museum, Electa, 2016
 Francesca Zanella, Ettore Sottsass: Catalogo ragionato dell'archivio 1922-1978 CSAC/Università di Parma, Silvana, Milan, 2017
 Fulvio Ferrari, Sottsass: 1000 Ceramics, AdArte s.r.l., 2017
 Luca Massimo Barbero, Pasquale Gagliardi, Marino Barovier, etc., Ettore Sottsass: The Glass, Skira/Rizzoli, Milan, 2017
 Gean Moreno, Ettore Sottsass and the Social Factory, Institute of Contemporary Art, Miami, 2020

References

External links

 Sottsass Associati
 Ettore Sottsass: Designer of the world, Château de Montsoreau-Museum of Contemporary Art, 2017
 Sottsass design collection and other Memphis design
 A conversation with designer Ettore Sottsass, television interview with Charlie Rose, 29 November 2004, video.
 Ettore Sottsass. Existential Design, published by Hans Höger in domusWeb, Milan 2005.
 Emeco Nine-0 by Ettore Sottsass
 Design Biography Emeco
 The Life and Times of Ettore Sottsass
 Jennifer Kabat on Ettore Sottsass
 STORIES OF HOUSES: Ernest Mourmans' House in Belgium, by Ettore Sottsass
 Hans Höger on Ettore Sottsass: Existential Design, DomusWeb, April 2005.
 Olivetti official site 
 Obituary in The Times, 2 January 2008
 Design Museum Collection
 Cooper Hewitt Collection
 Information and pictures about the designer Ettore Sottsass Junior at the design agency TAGWERC 

1917 births
2007 deaths
Architects from Turin
Italian industrial designers
Italian furniture designers
Italian people of Austrian descent
Italian designers
Olivetti people
Designers
Compasso d'Oro Award recipients
Royal Designers for Industry